Hans Rosing (9 August 1625 – 13 April 1699) was a Norwegian clergyman. He served as Bishop of the Diocese of Oslo from 1664 until 1699.

Biography

He was born at Brønnøy in Nordland, Norway. He was the son of Claus Rasmussen Rosing (ca. 1602-1644) and Birgitte Christensdatter Schanche (1603-1681). Both his father and grandfather were priests. He attended Trondheim Cathedral School. From 1645 he went at the University of Copenhagen.  From 1649 he had the opportunity to study abroad and was enrolled at the universities of Leiden,  Leipzig and Orléans.

From 1652 he started as vicar at Tureby on Zealand and shortly after he married Gertrud Hansdatter Borchardsen (1636-1660), daughter of  Hans Borchardsen (1597-1643), Bishop of Ribe. He was transferred to Kalundborg in 1660. He served as Bishop of the Diocese of Oslo (Akershus stift) from 1664 until his death in 1699.

As bishop, he encouraged improved clerical training. He also collaborated closely with  Viceroy (Statholder) Ulrik Frederik Gyldenløve (1638–1704) who was Governor-general of Norway. Additionally he arranged for the construction of Vår Frelsers kirke (now Oslo Cathedral). The foundation was laid in 1694 and the church was consecrated in November 1697.

Rosing was married twice; 1st with Gertrud Hansdatter Borchardsen (1636-1660), 2nd with Kirsten Bang (ca. 1635-1699).

References

1625 births
1699 deaths
People from Brønnøy
People educated at the Trondheim Cathedral School
University of Copenhagen alumni
University of Orléans alumni
Leiden University alumni
Leipzig University alumni
17th-century Norwegian Lutheran clergy
Norwegian Lutheran bishops
17th-century Lutheran bishops
Bishops of Oslo